The Woolpack Walk is a challenge walk which starts and finishes at the Woolpack Inn, Eskdale in the Lake District of England.

Route
The route is generally tackled clockwise, taking in the following summits:
Slight Side
Sca Fell
Scafell Pike
Broad Crag
Ill Crag
Esk Pike
Bow Fell
Crinkle Crags
Hard Knott
Harter Fell

See also

Bob Graham Round

References

External links
Woolpack Inn Homepage
 Woolpack walk is at coordinates 

Geography of Cumbria
Tourist attractions in Cumbria
Challenge walks